Strensall railway station was a minor railway station serving the village of Strensall in North Yorkshire, England.

History

It is situated on the York to Scarborough Line and was opened on 5 July 1845 by the York and North Midland Railway. It closed on 22 September 1930. The station building is grade II listed.
Currently a private residence.

Reopening
There has been talk of reopening a station at Strensall as well as neighbouring Haxby for a number of years. These reopenings were part of the 2001 local transport plan. But in 2010 even the more modest plan to reopen only Haxby was postponed pending further funding decisions.
Recently calls for a new rail link north of York station were reignited during the local elections of 2019 where Strensall was cited for its lost links and possible redevelopment.

Route

References

External links
 Strensall station on navigable 1947 O. S. map

Disused railway stations in North Yorkshire
Grade II listed buildings in North Yorkshire
Railway stations in Great Britain opened in 1845
Railway stations in Great Britain closed in 1930
Former York and North Midland Railway stations
George Townsend Andrews railway stations
Grade II listed railway stations